Karen Vivienne Gunn (born 12 May 1962) is a New Zealand former cricketer who played as a right-handed batter, right-arm medium bowler and occasional wicket-keeper. She appeared in 9 Test matches and 45 One Day Internationals for New Zealand between 1985 and 1993. Her final WODI appearance was in the final of the 1993 Women's Cricket World Cup. She played domestic cricket for Canterbury.

References

External links

1962 births
Living people
Cricketers from Christchurch
New Zealand women cricketers
New Zealand women Test cricketers
New Zealand women One Day International cricketers
Canterbury Magicians cricketers
Wicket-keepers